Manavely is a legislative assembly constituency in the Union territory of Puducherry in India.
 Manavely assembly constituency was part of Puducherry (Lok Sabha constituency).

Members of Legislative Assembly

Election results

2021

References 

 

Assembly constituencies of Puducherry